Link BC was a minor political party in the Province of British Columbia, Canada, describing itself as "centre-right".

In September 2004, it joined with the British Columbia Democratic Alliance, the Citizens Action Party and the British Columbia Moderate Democratic Movement to form the British Columbia Democratic Coalition.  Link BC and the CAP pulled out of the coalition less than a month later, and announced their own plans to merge under the Link BC name.  The BCDC became the founding core of Democratic Reform British Columbia. Link BC was officially de-registered with Elections BC in August 2009.

Provincial political parties in British Columbia
2009 disestablishments in British Columbia
Political parties disestablished in 2009